Serumakkanallur is a village in the Papanasam taluk of Thanjavur district, Tamil Nadu, India.

Demographics 

As per the 2001 census, Serumakkanallur had a total population of 2163 with 1058 males and 1105 females. The sex ratio was 1044. The literacy rate was 79.1.

References 

 

Villages in Thanjavur district